India–China Border Roads (ICBRs, ICB Roads) is a Government of India project for developing infrastructure along the Sino-Indian border by constructing strategic roads, including bridges and tunnels. The ICBR project is largely in response to Chinese infrastructure development along the borderlands with India.

As of May 2021, India is constructing at least 177 roads in two phases of over  total length along its Line of Actual Control (LAC) with China under the "Border Infrastructure and Management Fund" (BIMF) of Ministry of Home Affairs. This includes 73 roads of  length under ICBR-I (Phase-I) approved in 2005 and additional 104 roads of more than  length under ICBR-II (Phase-II) approved in 2020.

India has set up an inter-departmental "Empowered Committee" (EC) headed by the Ministry of Defence to expedite the issue resolution and timely completion of ICBR infrastructure after the delay in forest/wildlife clearance and land acquisition, rugged terrain, limited working season due to winter and rains, scarcity of construction material, etc. resulted in the missed deadlines in the past. Some of the important already completed projects include the Darbuk-Shayok-Daulat Beg Oldie Road (DS-DBO) and Atal Tunnel under Rohtang Pass; and the under-construction important projects include the Sela Tunnel in Arunachal Pradesh and a road-cum-rail tunnel under the Brahmaputra river in Assam.

Several entities are responsible for constructing ICBR, including Border Roads Organisation (BRO) which handles the bulk of the ICBR road construction work, National Highways Authority of India (NHAI), Ministry of Development of North Eastern Region (MoDNER), Central Public Works Department (CPWD), public works departments of respective states and others. At least 67 per cent of the road network assigned to BRO falls under ICBR.

By March 2021, of the 61 ICBR-I roads assigned to BRO, connectivity on 59 roads or 95+ per cent of the total length had been achieved and among these 42 have been black topped.

About

Strategic infrastructure requirements 

In the wake of heightened road and track construction work undertaken by China along India's northern and eastern frontiers, India constituted a China Study Group (CSG) in 1997, to study the requirement of road communication, along the China border for brisk movement of troops in the event of armed conflict. At the end of the study, the CSG identified a network of 73 roads, called the India–China Border Roads (ICBR), to be developed along the Indo-China border. The Cabinet Committee on Security (CCS) in 1999 approved the construction of these roads by the Border Roads Organisation (BRO) under the Ministry of Defence. The project was to be completed by 2006 but the deadline was then extended to 2012. The Standing Committee on Defence, a body for legislative oversight, appraised strategic road connectivity in 2018. With regard to the slow pace of construction of border roads, the Border Roads Organisation stated to the committee:
Reasons such as climate, geography, land acquisition and natural disasters also accounted for the delays. In 2013 the United Progressive Alliance (UPA) government took multiple administrative decisions to speed up construction. The 2017 Doklam standoff further raised the profile of the issue with the Modi government for border infrastructure along the China border. ICBRs are present in Jammu and Kashmir, Ladakh, Himachal Pradesh, Uttarakhand, Sikkim and Arunachal Pradesh.

Border Infrastructure Management Authority (BIMA) 
In May 2022, Indian govt sources announced establishment of the Border Infrastructure Management Authority (BIMA) which is responsible for the integrated development of the border areas including road, rail, water, power, communications infrastructure, and the Vibrant Village Program for improvement of living conditions of natives in these areas to prevent their out-migration as the border villages are considered strategic assets.

ICBR project phases

ICBR-I or Phase-1 

Phase-1 or ICBR-1 project was conceived in 1999 with a target completion date of 2012 to construct 73 strategic ICBRs of nearly 4000 km length. It was approved in 2005. Of the 73 ICBR in Phase-1, the construction of 61 roads was assigned to BRO and remaining 12 to CPWD. Of the 61 roads assigned to BRO, 12 roads of 1,064.14 km length in Ladakh, 5 roads of 116.99 km length in Himachal Pradesh, 14 roads of 355 km length in Uttarakhand, 3 roads of 61.98 km length in Sikkim, and 27 roads of 1,725.46 km length are in Arunachal Pradesh. ICBR-I is seen as a successor of BRO's Project HIMANK which was initiated in 1985 for the construction of border roads in Ladakh.

As of March 2021, of the 61 ICBR-I roads assigned to BRO, connectivity on 59 roads of 3,205.16 km length have been achieved. Of these 61 roads where connectivity has been achieved, 42 roads of 1,530.38 km have been paved with the black top.

ICBR-II or Phase-2 

ICBR-II was approved in 2020-21 fiscal budget, to construct additional 104 roads of more than 6,700 km length. The proposal for the Phase 2 was first conceived in 2013 with the goal of constructing 32 roads along the border, expanded version of which was approved in 2020 with inclusion of additional roads. Amid the India-China skirmishes, the government asked all bodies to speed up the construction of the roads. Additional labour was also sent to these areas to assist in speeding up construction.

ICBR-II covers construction of several roads, 18 feet wide foot tracks and border out posts (BoPs) connecting several LAC patrol points (PP) and Border Personnel Meeting (BPM) points. As of 2021, in Arunachal Pradesh under the ICBR-II India is building 57 roads, 32 helipads, 47 BoPs, 12 staging camps for ITBP and many 18 ft tracks.

BIMF funding and progress of construction 

ICBR infrastructure is funded by the “Border Infrastructure and Management Fund" (BIMF) which provides funding for India's border infrastructures along Bangladesh, Pakistan and China borders.

Annual funding was as follows: INR 11,800 crore in 2020–21, INR 8,050 crore in 2019–20, INR 6,700 crore in 2018–19, INR 5450 crore in 2017–18, between INR 3,300 crore to INR 4,600 crore annually from 2008 to 2016.

Due to significantly increased annual funding, the ICBR construction picked up pace after 2014:

 Road length construction completed: 4,764 km roads during 2014-20 versus 3,610 km during 2008–14.
 Mountain formation-cutting completed: 470 km during 2017-20 versus 230 km during 2008–17.
 Surface-clearing completed: 380 km during 2017-20 versus 170 km roads during 2008–17.
 Bridges completed: 14,450 metres length during 2014-20 versus 7,270 metres during 2008–14.
 Road tunnels completed: 6 tunnels during 2014-20 including Atal Tunnel at Rohtang Pass in the Himachal Pradesh versus 1 tunnel during 2008–14.
Funds were also diverted from "General Staff (GS) roads" to ICBRs.

Types of ICBRs 
Of the 73 ICBR of 3812 km, 61 of 3323.57 km were assigned to BRO, which have been subdivided based on their usage type. China Study Group had identified roads vital for defending the whole LAC at national level. Ministry of Defence had identified sub-national level inter-state and regional roads vital for larger military logistics, which were assigned to CPWD and state PWDs. ITBP which mans the forward staging areas and frontier posts on the LAC had identified strategic roads to connect the individual posts to the main trunk and arterial roads. Other roads include connecting inter state and state level. The work structure for the ICBRs is divided among different agencies including the National Buildings Construction Corporation (NBCC), Central Public Works Department (CPWD), National Projects Construction Corporation (NPCC) and state public works departments.

List of ICB Roads

Phase 1 

Phase-I consists of 3812 km roads.

Key 

 Maplink: Interactive map with road.
OSM ID: Provides a link to road on OpenStreetMap (OSM) in the form of a relation.
Status: Status does not represent current state of the road.
Length: Present / planned
Comments and citation: Further information about the road including bridges and tunnels.

Arunachal Pradesh 

In Arunachal Pradesh the ICBR project, in coordination with other government programmes, has connected a number of border outposts and frontier areas to the national highway network such as Kharsang La, Taksing, Lamang, Gelling, Kibithu and Dichu. Major road projects in Arunachal Pradesh include the 'Sela Pass project' which consists of the under construction Sela Tunnel.

Uttarakhand 

In Uttarakhand, the border most points of Pulam Sumda, Mana Pass, Niti Pass, Lapthal and Rimkhim, and Lipulekh have been connected.

Ladakh

The forward most localities and border outposts of Daulat Beg Oldie (DBO), Hotspring, Demchok and Zursar have been connected. Roads connectivity has reduced their reliance on air transport.

Sikkim

Related geo-strategic projects 
Geostrategic initiatives include the Andaman and Nicobar Command and the Quadrilateral Security Dialogue.

Vibrant villages Border Area Development Plan 

Under the 2022-23 budget, India intends to repopulate, upgrade or establish 500 villages near the zero-line border along the LAC from Ladakh to Arunachal Pradesh, while China has already established 628 villages by 2021 at a cost of $6.4 billion with heavily subsidized telecommunication, internet, electricity and utilities, etc. According to this report, out of 172 (incl. 24 3G & 78 4G) out 236 villages in Ladakh had telecom connectivity. For example, 19 border villages in Chushul had no or partial communication infrastructure.

Border airport and ALG projects 
 
 

The People's Liberation Army's Western Theater Command is responsible for the defense of China along the whole line of actual control with India. The Indian Armed Forces has divided the LAC into 3 sectors - the western sector across Ladakh and the Chinese-controlled Aksai Chin, the central sector across Himachal Pradesh and Uttrakhand, and the eastern sector across Sikkim and Arunachal Pradesh. Similarly, the Indian Airforce has the Prayagraj-based Central Air Command, Delhi-based Western Air Command, and Shillong-based Eastern Air Command to cover the LAC.

 Ladakh airports and advanced landing grounds (ALGs) at Daulat Beg Oldi, Fukche, Leh, Nyoma, Padum, Thoise and the proposed Parma Valley ALG.
 Himachal Pradesh shares 250 km border with China. Airports include Shimla Airport, Kullu-Manali Airport, and the proposed Rangrik.
 Uttrakhand has 350 km border with Tibet. Airports and ALGs include Chinyalisaur Airport and Pithoragarh Airport ALG.
 Sikkim consists of the Pakyong Airport ALG.
 Arunachal Pradesh has a number of airports and ALGs at Aalo, Mechuka, Pasighat, Tawang Air Force Station, Tuting, Vijoynagar, Walong, Ziro, Daporijo, Arunachal Pradesh and the proposed Alinye (ALG),

Border bridge projects 
 Teesta River road bridge in Sikkim, already completed in 2020 will serve Doklam sector.
 Teesta River railway bridge, under construction in July 2020 and on target for completion by December 2020.
 New bridges on Brahmaputra River in Assam will serve Arunachal Pradesh in Eastern Sector.

Border railway projects 

India's Ministry of Defence (MoD) has identified at least 15 new geostrategic rail lines to be constructed near the China, Pakistan and Nepal borders for troop deployments. In comparison, China has built lines up to Shigatse in Tibet, with plans to connect it to Nepal and further to India. After these lines were proposed by the ministry of defense in 2013, the Government of India approved the initial surveys of all 14 lines in 2014, Some of these as well as other related projects are as follows:

Other border road projects 

 Ladakh-Himachal-Uttrakhand
Char Dham Highway, not part of ICBR
 Pooh–Chumar Road & Harsil-Kharcham Road. Both were announced in September 2020 in addition to the ICBR phase 1, and each will cost between INR2,000 cr to INR3,000 cr.

 Sikkim
 Bagrakote-Gangtok Highway: 250 km-long road originating from NH17 (NH31 as per old numbering) near Bagrakote in the Dooars to Gangtok is being upgraded to national highway standard in July 2020 by the National Highway and Infrastructure Development Corporation Limited. It passes through Algarah-Lava-Rishyap (in West Bengal on Sikkim border)-Rhenock-Rorathang-Pakyong-Ranipool to Gangtok. In addition to the existing landslide-prone NH10 Sevoke-Gangtok Highway, this will provide alternate access to the state capital Gangtok and beyond to the India-China border.
 Arunachal Pradesh
Arunachal Frontier Highway, proposed along the India-China border and is not part of ICBR.
 Arunachal East-West Corridor, proposed across the foothills of lower upper Arunachal Pradesh, not part of ICBR.
 Trans-Arunachal Highway, existing operational highway.

Border tunnel projects 

As of sept 2021, India is constructing 31 road tunnels (up from 17 tunnels of 100 km total length planned in 2017), 20 in J&K and 11 in Ladakh, at the combined cost of INR1.4 lakh crore (~US$17.5 billion), this includes tunnels constructed by Ministry of Road Transport and Highways (MoRTH). As of January 2023, of the tunnel projects assigned to BRO, 5 were complete, 9 were under construction ( 6 - Arunachal Pradesh, 4 - Jammu and Kashmir, 1 - Ladakh), 11 were in DPR phase, the rest have been assigned to other entities.
 BRO keeps 27 mountain passes open and plans to build tunnels under all of those so that traffic remains open throughout the year and the army will save several hundred crores of rupees annually presently spent on airlifting logistics supplies. Of the 13 highest motorable mountain passes in the world, 10 are in India, and out of which 8 are in Ladakh only.  Out of 27 mountain passes maintained by BRO, tunnels are being constructed under 11 and the detail project report of tunnel under 9 is being prepared, tunnels will also be built under the remaining 7 mountain passes so that the army can reach the border at a faster pace with year-around all-weather connectivity through all 27 passes. Some of these tunnels have dual road and rail usage, such as the world's longest three tube rail and road tunnel under Brahmaputra. Modi government doubled the BRO's budget of GS Roads (General Staff roads for military) of BRO in 2 years, Rs2500cr in fy2021-21 to Rs3500cr in fy2022-23 to Rs5000cr in 2023–24.

BRO has been constructing tunnels the strategic ICBR roads on Sino-Indian border to provide the year-round all-weather connectivity. Without these tunnels, the road access to high altitude posts on Sino-India border is closed for six months every year due to snowfall and rain, and supplies are through airlift only. These tunnels will reduce the travel time and operational costs, and eliminate the risk of avalanche and landslide. List of tunnels, from west to east along the Indo-Chinese border, is as follows:

Tunnel construction in Himalayan areas have picked up the pace. For example, Uttrakhand has 18 existing tunnels in January 2023 and 66 more tunnels will be built in next 10 years, some of which are already under construction and others are either in DPR or planning phase.

Sea ports and waterways projects 
Sagarmala port development project and the National Waterways projects will also enhance geostrategic capabilities along LAC and elsewhere. Waterway projects in Assam on Brahmaputra River and its tributaries are of geostrategic importance for the movement of military assets, these include National Waterway 2 and Subansiri River.

Under-river tunnel 
Gohpur–Numaligarh under-river tunnel, is an under construction tunnel under the Brahmaputra river.

Mobile and internet connectivity 

In June 2020, it was announced that 54 villages in the Ladakh region; including the Demchok is among the 19 in Kargil, 11 in Zanskar and 7 in Nubra Valley; will receive mobile phone connectivity from Jio via the satellite connected towers under the Universal Service Obligation Funding (USOF) programme.

Radars 

 Uttarakhand
 Doppler radar at Mukteshwar and Surkanda Devi
 Air defence radars, under construction, at Chamoli, Pithoragarh and Uttarkashi

Northeast connectivity projects 
 Northeast Connectivity projects
 Look-East Connectivity projects
 North-South and East-West Corridor
 India-Myanmar-Thailand Friendship Highway
 BCIM Economic Corridor
 Asian Highway Network
 List of bridges on Brahmaputra River

See also 

India-China border infrastructure
 Geostrategic
 List of disputed territories of India
 Western Theater Command, China
 East, Central and Western Command LAC, of India
 List of Indian Air Force stations 
 List of People's Liberation Army Air Force airbases

 Similar rail development
 Future of rail transport in India, rail development
 China–India railway

 Similar roads development
 Bharatmala
 Diamond Quadrilateral, Subsumed in Bharatmala
 Golden Quadrilateral, completed national road development connectivity older scheme
 National Highways Development Project, Subsumed in Bharatmala
 North-South and East-West Corridor, Subsumed in Bharatmala
 Expressways of India

 Similar ports and river transport development
 List of National Waterways in India
 Sagar Mala project, national water port development connectivity scheme

 Similar air transport development
 Indian Human Spaceflight Programme
 UDAN, national airport development connectivity scheme

 General
 List of National Highways in India by highway number
 List of National Highways in India
 Transport in India

Notes

References

Further reading
Rajeswari Pillai Rajagopalan, Rahul Prakash (May 2013). Sino-Indian Border Infrastructure: An Update. ORF
 
 
 

China–India border
Roads in Ladakh
Roads in Arunachal Pradesh
Transport in Ladakh
Transport in Sikkim
Transport in Arunachal Pradesh
Roads in Uttarakhand
China–India relations
Proposed infrastructure in India
Proposed infrastructure in Arunachal Pradesh
Proposed infrastructure in Himachal Pradesh
Proposed infrastructure in Ladakh
Proposed infrastructure in Sikkim
Proposed infrastructure in Uttarakhand
Border Roads Organisation roads